The members of the 44th General Assembly of Newfoundland and Labrador were elected in the Newfoundland general election held in February 1999. The general assembly sat from 1999 to 2003.

The Liberal Party led by Brian Tobin formed the government. After Tobin reentered federal politics in October 2000, Beaton Tulk became interim party leader and Premier. Roger Grimes was elected party leader in February 2001.

Lloyd Snow served as speaker.

Arthur Maxwell House served as lieutenant governor of Newfoundland and Labrador until 2002. Edward Roberts succeeded House as lieutenant-governor.

Members of the Assembly 
The following members were elected to the assembly in 1999:

By-elections 
By-elections were held to replace members for various reasons:

References 

Terms of the General Assembly of Newfoundland and Labrador